Rezo is a German YouTuber who in 2019 ignited a fiery political debate with his video "Die Zerstörung der CDU". In it, he heavily criticized the then ruling grand coalition in Germany, especially the coalition leading party CDU.

He publishes on three YouTube channels and multiple other social media platforms.

Early life and education
Rezo was born in Wuppertal in 1992

and grew up in a pastor's family.<ref name="nov16">[https://www.youtube.com/watch?v=QVcIjFePxPo&t=539 How well do rezo and Julien Bam know each other?'] In: YouTube from 16 November 2018, 8:59 min.</ref>  From the age of 14 until one and a half years before his master's degree, he played in various bands. He plays the guitar. A distinguishing feature is his blue-colored hair. 
According to his own information, Rezo studied computer science at the Technical University of Dortmund and graduated in 2016 with a Master of Science. He has named Aachen as his place of residence.

Career
Since September 2012, Rezo has had his own channel on YouTube, with almost 1.6 million users as of 2019 which is mostly about music, including his own performances, as covers, mashups or remixes. On his second channel Rezo ja lol ey he usually jokes and converses with other YouTubers about line-ups, bizarre chat messages or hate comments.

In 2018, he created an ensemble cast music video of Hall of Fame (song) with 100 YouTube creators to celebrate having reached a million subscribers.

On 18 May 2019, one week before the 2019 European Parliament election, Rezo published under his second YouTube channel Rezo ja lol eyWie im alten Ägypten - AKK reagiert auf Anti-CDU-Video von Rezo, n-tv vom 23. Mai 2019. a 54-minute video named "Die Zerstörung der CDU", which literally means "The destruction of/by the CDU", in which he said that essential political positions, especially of the parties CDU/CSU and SPD, are destroying "our lives and our future". The 55-minute video, with a list of 247 references and citations of scientific literature, accused the governing conservative alliance for a range of unsustainable policies such as inactivity in politics of global warming, making politics for the rich, war and internet censorship. He explicitly warned against voting for the right-wing populist AfD, as they would "only make the world worse". Towards the end, he stated: "You always say that young people should be political, in which case you have to get to grips with it when they think your politics are shit". His video went viral, received more than 13 million views within the first eleven days and triggered a broad social debate. On 24 May 2019, two days ahead of the vote, Rezo was joined by more than 90 known bloggers in a three-minute followup video entitled A Statement of 90+ Youtubers'' which summarized the statements of the first video. They asked voters not to back Angela Merkel's bloc or the SPD, because of their politics of global warming.

In May 2019, after the EU election the leader of the CDU, Merkel's successor Annegret Kramp-Karrenbauer announced she wanted to "regulate" political opinion in election campaigns. This was met with a wide political backlash. Bundestag Vice President Claudia Roth stated: "For years, the Union (CDU/CSU) has said that populist-right-wing discourse shifting, sometimes even national-right-wing agitation should not be approached too hard." As soon as a blogger expressed himself critically, "[Kramp-Karrenbauer] fabulates about the restriction of freedom of expression in the election campaign, one can only hope that it is rooted in helplessness and not in political conviction."  In spite of the backlash, Kramp-Karrenbauer put the item "asymmetrical campaigning" on the agenda for a meeting of her party leadership on 2 July 2019.

In September 2019, Rezo won a Goldene Kamera Digital Award as a special jury prize.

After the Halle synagogue shooting in October 2019, Rezo took to Twitter to criticise German interior minister Horst Seehofer for suggesting increased surveillance of the country's gaming community. Rezo accused Seehofer and the CSU of incompetent leadership.

He also made videos on the "climate crisis", denouncing for instance the doubts on the scientific consensus publicly expressed by one of the EU Parliament's Vice-Presidents, Nicola Beer.

References

External links

Living people
German YouTubers
Video bloggers
1992 births